Məmmədabad (also, Mamedabad) is a village and municipality in the Saatly Rayon of Azerbaijan.  It has a population of 1,480.

References 

Populated places in Saatly District